Eschweilera jacquelyniae is a species of woody plant in the family Lecythidaceae. It is found only in Panama. It is threatened by habitat loss.

References

jacquelyniae
Flora of Panama
Endangered plants
Taxonomy articles created by Polbot